Christian Conrad (born 17 November 1931) is a Swiss former ice hockey goaltender who played for the Switzerland men's national ice hockey team in the 1956 Winter Olympics.

External links
Statistics at Sports-Reference.com
 

1931 births
Possibly living people
Ice hockey players at the 1956 Winter Olympics
Olympic ice hockey players of Switzerland
Swiss ice hockey goaltenders